Sir Neville Jordan  (born 15 May 1943) is a New Zealand electrical engineer and businessman.

Biography
Born in Petone on 15 May 1943, Jordan was the third child of Hercules Jordan, a welder, and only child of Lydia Marie Jordan (née Ashman), a laundry worker. After completing the engineering intermediate year at Victoria University of Wellington, Jordan studied electrical engineering at the University of Canterbury from 1964 to 1966, graduation with a Bachelor of Engineering in 1967. He was a New Zealand universities judo representative. After graduating, he worked for companies including IBM and Philips.

In 1975, Jordan founded MAS Technology, a microwave technology company whose IPO was on the NASDAQ main board.

In 1995, he founded the Jordan Foundation, which provides scholarships for higher learning and support for the arts. In 1998, he founded venture capital business Endeavour Capital, which has invested in more than 35 New Zealand start-ups.

Jordan was president of the Royal Society of New Zealand between 2006 and 2009; preceded by Jim Watson and followed by Garth Carnaby.

Since 2015, Jordan has been chancellor of Victoria University of Wellington, having been a member of the university council since 2013.

Honours and awards
In the 1999 Queen's Birthday Honours, Jordan was appointed a Companion of the New Zealand Order of Merit, for services to telecommunications and export. He was conferred an honorary DEng degree by the University of Canterbury. In 2012, he was recognised as Wellingtonian of the year. In the 2015 New Year Honours, he was promoted to Knight Companion of the New Zealand Order of Merit, for services to business, science and the community. He is a Companion of Royal Society Te Apārangi.

In 2006, Jordan was inducted into the New Zealand Business Hall of Fame.

References

External links
 Endeavour Capital profile

1943 births
Living people
People from Petone
Victoria University of Wellington alumni
University of Canterbury alumni
Chancellors of the Victoria University of Wellington
New Zealand electrical engineers
New Zealand businesspeople
Presidents of the Royal Society of New Zealand
Knights Companion of the New Zealand Order of Merit
Businesspeople awarded knighthoods
Companions of the Royal Society of New Zealand